Louise Elizabeth Milliken (born 19 September 1983) is a New Zealand former cricketer who played as a right-arm fast-medium bowler. She appeared in 2 Test matches, 47 One Day Internationals and 1 Twenty20 International for New Zealand between 2002 and 2007. She played domestic cricket for Northern Districts.

References

External links

1983 births
Living people
People from Morrinsville
New Zealand women cricketers
New Zealand women Test cricketers
New Zealand women One Day International cricketers
New Zealand women Twenty20 International cricketers
Northern Districts women cricketers
Cricketers from Waikato